Max's Group, Inc., formerly the Max's Group of Companies, is a restaurant company in the Philippines.

History
The Max's Group foundation is linked to the establishment of Max's of Manila in 1945 by couple Maximo Jimenez and Ruby Trota in their home serving primarily to American soldiers. which would become the first outlet of the core restaurant brand of the Max's Group. For years up to around 50 branches were run by family members until Max's restaurant became open for franchising. The first franchised outlet opened in 1997 at the Harrison Plaza in Manila.

The Max's Group start acquiring rights to become the master franchise of foreign brands in the Philippines in 2006 first introducing Krispy Kreme in the country in that year. The group also later introduced Jamba Juice.

In 2014, the Max's Group entered the Philippine Stock Exchange through a backdoor listing through  Pancake House Inc. gaining control of the latter's brands which include the Pancake House, Teriyaki Boy and Yellow Cab Pizza.

To aid its domestic and international operations, the Max's Group began to acquire Singaporean management firm Global Mac Services in 2015.

The group in May 2018 announced its plan for a further shift to the franchising model within the next five years in a bid to boost the company's growth. At that time 69 of the Max's Group shares are owned by the company while the rest are largely owned by its franchise stores.

Brands
 Max's Restaurant - is a Philippine-based multinational restaurant chain which serves fried chicken and other Filipino dishes.
 Max's Corner Bakery
 Yellow Cab Pizza - is a pizza restaurant chain based in the Philippines.
 Pancake House - is a pancake house chain.
 Krispy Kreme Philippines
 Jamba Juice Philippines
 Teriyaki Boy
 Dencio's
 Maple
 Max's Kabisera
 Le Coeur de France
 Singkit
 Sizzlin' Steak

Former brands
 Meranti (defunct; acquired by Privato Hotel)

See also
Jollibee Foods Corporation

References

Companies based in Makati
Companies listed on the Philippine Stock Exchange
Multinational food companies
Multinational companies headquartered in the Philippines